Jaureguiberry is a village and resort of the Costa de Oro in the Canelones Department of southern Uruguay.

Geography

Location

Population
In 2011 Jaureguiberry had a population of 458.

Etymology
The village is named after its founder Miguel Jaureguiberry, who resided there until his death in 1951.

Sights
Jaureguiberry boasts five campsites: Federación Uruguaya de Magisterio, Harbour Workers, Navy Subofficers, Public Health Psychiatry Workers and Federación Nacional de Profesores de Secundaria.

In 2016 was built an Earthship school at this location.

References

External links

 Instituto Nacional de Estadística: Plan of Jaureguiberry

Populated places in the Canelones Department
Seaside resorts in Uruguay